Contemporary Indian Sculpture  is a 1987 Bengali documentary film directed and written by Buddhadev Dasgupta. It is a documentary on Indian sculpture.

External links
 

1987 films
Bengali-language Indian films
Indian documentary films
Films directed by Buddhadeb Dasgupta
Documentary films about the visual arts